Hilali Antony Wober (born 1939), is a retired Royal Air Force Officer and former rower who competed for England.

Rowing career
He represented England and won a bronze medal in the eights at the 1958 British Empire and Commonwealth Games in Cardiff, Wales.

The eights crew consisted entirely of members of the Thames Rowing Club and who won the final of the Empire Games Trials from the 1st and 3rd Trinity Boat Club, Cambridge.

RAF career
Wober was a doctor and trained pilot in the RAF reaching the rank of Air Commodore.

References

1939 births
English male rowers
Commonwealth Games medallists in rowing
Commonwealth Games bronze medallists for England
Rowers at the 1958 British Empire and Commonwealth Games
Living people
Medallists at the 1958 British Empire and Commonwealth Games